Skip-IJ is the fourth studio album by dance music English DJ and music producer State of Bengal, released in 2007 by Betelnut Records.

Critical response

Louis Patterson of BBC Music said of Skip-IJ, "Proof that the Asian Underground can be both fun and thoughtful." Gaurav of AsianVibrations.com rated it 7/10 and said of the album, "State of Bengal gives us an album that you can listen to whenever you are in a dubbed out dnb mood. This is a true classic in the making (barring a few speed bumps)." Indian Electronica said, "this album defies modern dance-floor convention with its wonderfully refreshing and bouncy rhythms - paradoxically sounding like a jazz throwback to break-beat employing an aesthetic which draws from Afro-Brazilian and Indian influence..."

Track listing

Personnel
Luke Gifford – recording engineer
State of Bengal – mix engineer

References

External links

https://stateofbengal.bandcamp.com/album/skip-ij-instrumental-album-version

2007 albums
Bengali-language albums
State of Bengal albums